The following is a list of roads numbered 720:

Canada
 Saskatchewan Highway 720

Costa Rica
 National Route 720

India
 National Highway 720

United Kingdom
 A720 road

United States
 Kentucky Route 720
 Louisiana Highway 720
 Nevada State Route 720
 Ohio State Route 720
 Puerto Rico Highway 720
 Virginia State Route 720